Giovanni Antonio Volpi (1686–1717) was an Italian editor, publisher and poet.

He was born in Padua. In 1717, along with his brother Gaetano and the engraver Giuseppe Comino, they founded a publishing house and book shop under the name of Libreria Cominiana or Volpi-Comminiana. The print specialized in high quality classics. Volpi studied philosophy and rhetoric and became a professor emeritus at the University of Padua.

References

Works

 

1686 births
1717 deaths
Italian publishers (people)
Italian poets
People from Padua